Lagartos de Tabasco were a Mexican football team. The club was founded in 2002 in Villahermosa, Tabasco, México and it played a few tournaments in Primera A till 2006 when the club left the league due to financial problems.

History
The club's first match in the Primera A was against Nacional de Tijuana on 12 January 2003, the game was a 0–0 draw. The club was relegated to Group B along with clubs Zacatepec, Tapatío, and  Jaguares de Tapachula. The club finished third in their division during their first tournament so qualified to the playoffs but fail to reach the final losing 5–2 to the eventual tournament champions Club Leon.

In 2006 the club played its last tournament match against Puebla FC on 22 April 2006 beating them 2–0. The club finished last in Ascenso with a record of 8 wins, 2 draws and 9 losses; scoring 22 goals and allowing 23. The club moved to Coatzacoalcos and became a reserve team for Tiburones Rojos de Veracruz.

Notable players
 Álvaro González – most goals scored 48 2004–06

Footnotes

Villahermosa
Football clubs in Tabasco
Defunct football clubs in Mexico
Association football clubs established in 2002
Association football clubs disestablished in 2006
2002 establishments in Mexico
2006 disestablishments in Mexico
Ascenso MX teams